Lee Eun-ji (born July 23, 2006) is a South Korean swimmer.

Career
In July 2021, she represented South Korea at the 2020 Summer Olympics held in Tokyo, Japan. She competed in 100m backstroke and 200m backstroke events. In both events, she did not advance to compete in the semifinal.

References

External links
 

2006 births
Living people
South Korean female backstroke swimmers
Swimmers at the 2020 Summer Olympics
Olympic swimmers of South Korea
21st-century South Korean women